GoldenEye is a 1996 pinball machine released by Sega Pinball. It is based on the 1995 James Bond film of the same name.

Gameplay
There are 5 modes which can be started at the Mode Start Lane. You cannot start one mode while in another. In non-mode single ball play, the bumpers cycle the currently lit mode.  10M is automatically added to your Mode Total, displayed after the mode ends (with the exception of Xenia Extra Ball). 

Complete Scenes: Complete the following scenes:
Xenia Extra Ball
Satellite Hurryup
Nerve Gas Plant 
Train/Tank Multiball
Send Spike

Once all modes are completed, the Start Mode saucer will light for a wizard mode by completing the 007 Top Lanes, finishing Shootout, successfully completing Q's Pen, and spelling "GOLDENEYE".

External links
IPDB listing for GoldenEye

Sega pinball machines
Pinball machines based on films
James Bond games
Pinball
1996 pinball machines